Antonio Rodriguez San Juan (born April 12, 1957) is a Venezuela Politician. He was the governor of Vargas State from 2000 to 2008. He is a member of the United Socialist Party of Venezuela (PSUV) of Venezuela's president, Hugo Chávez.

External links
official bio

1957 births
Living people
Governors of Vargas (state)
People from Maracaibo
United Socialist Party of Venezuela politicians
Members of the Venezuelan Constituent Assembly of 1999